The Cosmic Calendar is a method to visualize the chronology of the universe, scaling its currently understood age of 13.8 billion years to a single year in order to help intuit it for pedagogical purposes in science education or popular science.

In this visualization, the Big Bang took place at the beginning of January 1 at midnight, and the current moment maps onto the end of December 31 just before midnight. 
At this scale, there are 437.5 years per cosmic second, 1.575 million years per cosmic hour, and 37.8 million years per cosmic day.

The concept was popularized by Carl Sagan in his 1977 book The Dragons of Eden and on his 1980 television series Cosmos. Sagan goes on to extend the comparison in terms of surface area, explaining that if the Cosmic Calendar is scaled to the size of a football field, then "all of human history would occupy an area the size of [his] hand". 

A similar analogy used to visualize the geologic time scale and the history of life on Earth is the Geologic Calendar

Cosmology 

Date in year calculated from formula

T(days) = 365 days * ( 1- T_Gya/13.797 )

Evolution of life on Earth

Human evolution

History begins

See also

  
 
 
 List of timelines

References

External links

More information on the image used for this article.
The Cosmic Calendar in a Google Calendar format
The Cosmic Calendar relayed in real time.

Units of time
Calendar
Time in astronomy